Bude is an electoral division of Cornwall in the United Kingdom.

From 2013 to 2021, it returned two members to sit on Cornwall Council, making it the only division to elect more than one Councillor. After boundary changes at the 2021 election, it now returns only one member. The current councillor is Peter La Broy, who was elected as a Liberal Democrat, but now sits as an Independent after leaving the Liberal Democrats in June 2021.

Councillors

2013-2021

2021–present

Extent

2013–2021
The former division represented the town of Bude, the villages of Flexbury and Poughill, and the hamlets of Lynstone, Upton, and Crooklets. The hamlet of Bush was shared with the Grenville and Stratton division. It covered 1,139 hectares in total.

2021–present
Bude division represents the town of Bude and the hamlets of Lynstone and Upton. The village of Flexbury is shared with the Stratton, Kilkhampton and Morwenstow division.

Election results

2021–present

2021 election

2013–2021

2018 by-election

2017 election

2013 election

References

Bude
Electoral divisions of Cornwall Council